Yarmouth Junction station was a passenger rail station in Yarmouth, Maine, United States. The Amtrak Downeaster utilizes the former Maine Central Railroad line, which passes to the northwest of town. The Yarmouth Junction station building is now gone, but the junction itself is still active.

There have been discussions about developing the line between Yarmouth Junction and Brunswick, Maine.

History 
It built stables (which could accommodate around one thousand horses), granaries, a hospital and offices. Around the same time, troops of the French Army were forming there from points to the west in preparation to ship out from Portland on steamships.

References in popular culture 

"That's what I was aiming for," Maren Madsen Christensen wrote in her memoir, From Jutland's Brown Heather to the Land Across the Sea. Christensen died in 1965, aged 93. She is buried in Yarmouth's Riverside Cemetery alongside her husband, Christian, and two of their four children—son Einar and daughter Gloria. (Einar served in the United States Army; Gloria in the U.S. Navy.) Another, daughter Marie, is buried in Walnut Hill Cemetery in North Yarmouth alongside her husband, Ernest Hayes Allen. Another daughter, Thora, married Sidney Maurice Hamilton. They are at rest in Evergreen Cemetery in Portland.

References 

Transportation buildings and structures in Cumberland County, Maine
Stations along Boston and Maine Railroad lines

Transportation in Yarmouth, Maine
Former railway stations in Maine
Demolished railway stations in the United States
Commercial buildings in Yarmouth, Maine